Patrick J. Diegnan Jr. (born March 19, 1949) is an American Democratic Party politician who has represented the 18th Legislative District in the New Jersey Senate since 2016.

Early life 
The youngest of seven children born to immigrants from Ireland, Diegnan was born and raised in South Plainfield, attending Sacred Heart Grammar School and then graduating from South Plainfield High School in 1966. Residents of South Plainfield, Diegnan and his wife Anita have been married since 1976 and have two children, Heather and Tara, along with a grandchild. Diegnan received a B.A. from Seton Hall University in Political Science / Government in 1970 and was awarded a J.D. from the Seton Hall University School of Law in 1973. Currently, Diegnan is an attorney in private practice in South Plainfield and is a member of the New Jersey and Middlesex County Bar Associations since 1974. He is also a former instructor of law and accounting at Middlesex County College. Diegnan is currently the borough attorney for Spotswood and formerly served as borough attorney for South Plainfield and Milltown.

New Jersey Assembly 
Diegnan was first elected to represent the 18th District in 2001 replacing Barbara Buono who had been elected to the New Jersey Senate. He was re-elected to seven more two-year terms. Diegnan served in the Assembly as Deputy Speaker (2008-2016) and Parliamentarian (2005-2016), and was Chairman of the Education Committee and a member of the Regulated Professions and Consumer Affairs Committees.

New Jersey Senate 
Diegnan was selected by local Democratic committee members to receive appointment to the 18th District's Senate seat on May 5, 2016, after previous seat holder Peter J. Barnes III was appointed to a judgeship on the New Jersey Superior Court. Sworn into office on May 9, Diegnan won election to the remainder of the term in November, defeating retired judge and former Middlesex County Freeholder Roger W. Daley.

Committees 
Transportation
Joint Committee on Public Schools
Budget and Appropriation

District 18 
Each of the 40 districts in the New Jersey Legislature has one representative in the New Jersey Senate and two members in the New Jersey General Assembly. The representatives from the 18th District for the 2022—23 Legislative Session are:
 Senator Patrick J. Diegnan (D)
 Assemblyman Robert Karabinchak (D)
 Assemblyman Sterley Stanley (D)

Legislative accomplishments 
Diegnan was the primary sponsor of Assembly Bill 3331, introduced in 2003, which creates the certification of Technology Education for teachers. In 2011, he was the primary sponsor of Assembly Bill 3852, which requires voter approval at the annual school election or by the board of school estimate before a new charter school can be authorized to operate in a district. Under the existing system, the Commissioner of the New Jersey Department of Education can grant charters regardless of community opinion, with Diegnan noting that allowing voters and local boards of education a say in the granting of new schools would "help ensure that the charter schools that are created fit the needs of the community". The bill passed in the Assembly in June 2011 by a 47-17 margin.

Electoral history

New Jersey Senate

New Jersey Assembly

References

External links
Senator Diegnan's legislative web page, New Jersey Legislature
New Jersey Legislature financial disclosure forms
2016 2015 2014 2013 2012 2011 2010 2009 2008 2007 2006 2005 2004
Assembly Member Patrick J. Diegnan Jr., Project Vote Smart
New Jersey Voter Information Website 2003

1949 births
Living people
Democratic Party New Jersey state senators
Democratic Party members of the New Jersey General Assembly
New Jersey lawyers
People from South Plainfield, New Jersey
Politicians from Middlesex County, New Jersey
Seton Hall University School of Law alumni
21st-century American politicians